Gurmail Singh (born 30 December 1992) is an Indian field hockey player who plays as a defender.

References

1992 births
Living people
People from Sirsa district
Indian male field hockey players
Field hockey players from Haryana